Google App Engine (often referred to as GAE or simply App Engine) is a cloud computing platform as a service for developing and hosting web applications in Google-managed data centers. Applications are sandboxed and run across multiple servers. App Engine offers automatic scaling for web applications—as the number of requests increases for an application, App Engine automatically allocates more resources for the web application to handle the additional demand.

Google App Engine primarily supports Go, PHP, Java, Python, Node.js, .NET, and Ruby applications, although it can also support other languages via "custom runtimes". The service is free up to a certain level of consumed resources and only in standard environment but not in flexible environment. Fees are charged for additional storage, bandwidth, or instance hours required by the application. It was first released as a preview version in April 2008 and came out of preview in September 2011.

Supported features/restrictions

Runtimes and framework

Google App Engine primarily supports Go, PHP, Java, Python, Node.js, .NET, and Ruby applications, although it can also support other languages via "custom runtimes".

Python web frameworks that run on Google App Engine include Django, CherryPy, Pyramid, Flask, web2py and webapp2, as well as a custom Google-written webapp framework and several others designed specifically for the platform that emerged since the release. Any Python framework that supports the WSGI using the CGI adapter can be used to create an application; the framework can be uploaded with the developed application. Third-party libraries written in pure Python may also be uploaded.

Google App Engine supports many Java standards and frameworks.  Core to this is the servlet 2.5 technology using the open-source Jetty Web Server, along with accompanying technologies such as JSP.  JavaServer Faces operates with some workarounds. A newer release of App Engine Standard Java in Beta supports Java8, Servlet 3.1 and Jetty9.

Though the integrated database, Google Cloud Datastore, may be unfamiliar to programmers, it is accessed and supported with JPA, JDO, and by the simple low-level API. There are several alternative libraries and frameworks you can use to model and map the data to the database such as Objectify,  Slim3 and Jello framework.

The Spring Framework works with GAE. However, the Spring Security module (if used) requires workarounds.  Apache Struts 1 is supported, and Struts 2 runs with workarounds.

The Django web framework and applications running on it can be used on App Engine with modification. Django-nonrel aims to allow Django to work with non-relational databases and the project includes support for App Engine.

Reliability and support
All billed App Engine applications have a 99.95% uptime SLA.

App Engine is designed in such a way that it can sustain multiple datacenter outages without any downtime. This resilience to downtime is shown by the statistic that the High Replication Datastore saw 0% downtime over a period of a year.

Paid support from Google engineers is offered as part of Premier Accounts.

Bulk downloading
SDK version 1.2.2 adds support for bulk downloads of data using Python. The open source Python projects gaebar, approcket, and gawsh also allow users to download and back up App Engine data. No method for bulk downloading data from GAE using Java currently exists.

Restrictions
Developers have read only access to the filesystem on App Engine. Applications can use only virtual filesystems, like gae-filestore.
App Engine can only execute code called from an HTTP request (scheduled background tasks allow for self calling HTTP requests).
Users may upload arbitrary Python modules, but only if they are pure-Python; C and Pyrex modules are not supported.
Java applications may only use a subset (The JRE Class White List) of the classes from the JRE standard edition. This restriction does not exist with the App Engine Standard Java8 runtime.
A process started on the server to answer a request can't last more than 60 seconds (with the 1.4.0 release, this restriction does not apply to background jobs anymore).
Does not support sticky sessions (a.k.a. session affinity), only replicated sessions are supported including limitation of the amount of data being serialized and time for session serialization.

Major differences

Differences with other application hosting

Compared to other scalable hosting services such as Amazon EC2, App Engine provides more infrastructure to make it easy to write scalable applications, but can only run a limited range of applications designed for that infrastructure.

App Engine's infrastructure removes many of the system administration and development challenges of building applications to scale to hundreds of requests per second and beyond. Google handles deploying code to a cluster, monitoring, failover, and launching application instances as necessary.

While other services let users install and configure nearly any *NIX compatible software, App Engine requires developers to use only its supported languages, APIs, and frameworks. Current APIs allow storing and retrieving data from the document-oriented Google Cloud Datastore database; making HTTP requests; sending e-mail; manipulating images; and caching. Google Cloud SQL can be used for App Engine applications requiring a relational MySQL compatible database backend.

Per-day and per-minute quotas restrict bandwidth and CPU use, number of requests served, number of concurrent requests, and calls to the various APIs, and individual requests are terminated if they take more than 60 seconds or return more than 32MB of data.

Differences between SQL and GQL

Google App Engine's integrated Google Cloud Datastore database has a SQL-like syntax called "GQL" (Google Query Language). GQL does not support the Join statement. Instead, one-to-many and many-to-many relationships can be accomplished using .

Google Firestore is the successor to Google Cloud Datastore and replaces GQL with a document-based query method that treats stored objects as collections of documents.

Portability concerns
Developers worry that the applications will not be portable from App Engine and fear being locked into the technology. In response, there are a number of projects to create open-source back-ends for the various proprietary/closed APIs of app engine, especially the datastore.
AppScale, CapeDwarf and TyphoonAE are a few of the open source efforts.

AppScale automatically deploys and scales unmodified Google App Engine applications over popular public and private cloud systems and on-premises clusters. AppScale can run Python, Java, PHP, and Go applications on EC2, Google Compute Engine, Softlayer, Azure and other cloud vendors.

TyphoonAE can run Python App Engine applications on any cloud that support linux machines.

Web2py web framework offers migration between SQL Databases and Google App Engine, however it doesn't support several App Engine-specific features such as transactions and namespaces.

Kubernetes is an open-source job control system invented by Google to abstract away the infrastructure so that open-source (e.g. Docker) containerized applications can run on many types of infrastructure, such as Amazon Web Services, Microsoft Azure, and others.  This is one of Google's answers to the portability concern.

Backends
In Google I/O 2011, Google announced App Engine Backends, which are allowed to run continuously, and consume more memory. The Backend API was deprecated as of March 13, 2014, in favor of the Modules API.

Google Cloud SQL
In Oct 2011, Google previewed a zero maintenance SQL database, which supports JDBC and DB-API. This service allows creating, configuring, and using relational databases with App Engine applications. Google Cloud SQL supports MySQL 8.0, 5.7 and 5.6.

Usage quotas
Google App Engine requires a Google account to get started, and an account may allow the developer to register up to 25 free applications and an unlimited number of paid applications.

Google App Engine defines usage quotas for free applications. Extensions to these quotas can be requested, and application authors can pay for additional resources.

See also

 Amazon Web Services
 AppScale
 AWS Elastic Beanstalk
 Bluemix
 Cocaine (PaaS)
 Engine Yard
 Force.com
 GoGrid
 Google Apps Script
 Google Cloud Platform
 Heroku
 Jelastic
 Microsoft Azure
 OpenShift
 Oracle Cloud Platform
 Rackspace Cloud
 Skytap
 VMware

References

Bibliography

External links
Official marketing page

Official Google Cloud Platform Blog
Release notes
Google App Engine - Run your web applications on Google's infrastructure - a technical talk by Google engineer Guido van Rossum at Stanford University. (online video archive)
Benefits of adopting Google App Engine 
Using an external database with Google App Engine 
Java Frameworks and libraries supported
Web2py book -- online documentation -- Google App Engine deployment recipe
Google Cloud SQL Sample Projects
Google Cloud supports node.js
Appmd: Python development sample project. App Engine/django/Google Closure/Endpoints/Material design 

App Engine
Cloud platforms
Serverless computing
Computer-related introductions in 2008